The Uzbekistan national under-16 basketball team is a national basketball team of Uzbekistan, administered by the Basketball Federation of Uzbekistan.
It represents the country in international under-16 (under age 16) basketball competitions.

See also
Uzbekistan men's national basketball team
Uzbekistan women's national under-16 basketball team

References

External links
 Archived records of Uzbekistan team participations

Basketball in Uzbekistan
Basketball teams in Uzbekistan
Men's national under-16 basketball teams
Basketball